Little Barningham is a village and a civil parish in the English county of Norfolk. The nearest railway station is in the town of Sheringham where access to the national rail network can be made via the Bittern Line to Norwich. The nearest airport is Norwich International Airport. Little Barningham is within the area covered by North Norfolk District Council.

Origins
The villages name means 'homestead/village of Beorn's people'.

The village is mentioned in the great survey of 1086 known as the Domesday book. In the survey the village has the names of Bernincham and Berneswrde.The main landholders were The King, under the custody of Godric, William de Warenne and Bishop William. with the main tenant being Brant from Robert FitzCorbucion. The survey also mentions a church and a mill.

The Village
Little Barningham straddles a small valley with the parish church sitting on a mound beside the single street. The village comprises some forty dwellings. The village has now lost its post office, shop and pub but the village hall is still a thriving centre of the local community.

The Parish Church
The church is called St Andrews and is late mediaeval; it dates from about 1500 and was extensively restored in the last century. The church is built of flint and consists of a chancel, nave, west tower and south porch. The roof of the chancel has a hammerbeam roof but at one time the roof was thatched. There is a Jacobean box or pew which dates from 1640 and has the inscription: "FOR COUPLES JOYND IN WEDLOCK AND MY FRIENDS THAT STRANGER IS, THIS SEAT DID I INTEND BUILT AT THE COST AND CHARGE OF STEVEN CROSBEE. ALL YOU THAT DOE THIS SPACE PASS BY, AS YOU ARE NOWE, EVEN SO WAS I. REMEMBER DEATH FOR YOU MUST DYE AND AS I AM SOE SHALL YOU BE PREPARE THEREFORE TO FOLLOW ME". The carving of a skeleton in a shroud at one corner of the box described by Pevsner was stolen in 1996 having been in place for 400 years, but there are two replacements: one fixed to the pew in the original position and another at the back of the church carved by a well-wisher.

References

http://kepn.nottingham.ac.uk/map/place/Norfolk/Little%20Barningham

External links

North Norfolk
Villages in Norfolk
Civil parishes in Norfolk